Louis Bretez (died 1737) was a draughtsman, engraver, cartographer and designer of architectural ornament. In 1706 he published La Perspective pratique de l'Architecture. He was a  professor of perspective and a member of the Académie de peinture et de sculpture de Saint-Luc.

In 1734 he was commissioned to draw up the Turgot map of Paris. By contract, Turgot requested a very faithful reproduction with great accuracy. Bretez was allowed to enter mansions, houses and gardens to take measurements and draw pictures, and worked on the project from 1734 to 1736.

References 

French cartographers
18th-century French architects

1737 deaths

Deaths in Paris

Year of birth missing